Portugal competed at the 1984 Summer Olympics in Los Angeles, United States.

A delegation of thirty eight competitors participated in eleven sports, bringing home a total of three medals – a feat only repeated 20 years later, in Athens – including Portugal's first ever Olympic gold medal, through Carlos Lopes in the marathon. Rosa Mota, future marathon olympic champion, was the bronze medalist of this event, who appeared for the first time in the Olympics.

Portugal made its debut in the Olympic archery as well as in the diving, with Joana Figueiredo as the first Portuguese Olympic diver. Female competitors were also present at the first rhythmic gymnastics events in an Olympiad.

Medalists

Archery

Men's Competition:
 Rui Santos — 2324 pts (→ 51st)
{|class=wikitable style="text-align:center;"
!Distance!!90m!!70m!!50m!!30m!!Total
|-
!Round 1
|248||287||304||334||1173
|-
!Round 2
|240||290||291||330||1151
|-
!Total
|488||577||595||664||2324
|}

Athletics

Men's Events
100m:
 Luís Barroso
 Round 1 (heat 8) — 10.76 (→ 4th, did not advance)

200m:
 Luís Barroso
 Round 1 (heat 7) — 22.03 (→ 6th, did not advance)

5,000m:
 Ezequiel Canário
 Round 1 (heat 1) — 13:43.28 (→ 1st)
 Semi-final (heat 2) — 13:32.64 (→ 9th, advanced as 3rd fastest loser)
 Final — 13:26.50 (→ 9th)

 João Campos
 Round 1 (heat 3) — 13:46.27 (→ 5th)
 Semi-final (heat 2) — 13:34.46 (→ 10th, did not advance)

 António Leitão
 Round 1 (heat 4) — 13:51.33 (→ 1st)
 Semi-final (heat 1) — 13:39.76 (→ 2nd)
 Final — 13:09.20 (→  Bronze Medal)

10,000m:
 Fernando Mamede
 Round 1 (heat 1) — 28:21.87 (→ 1st)
 Final — did not finish

Marathon:
 Carlos Lopes — 2:09:21 OR (→  Gold Medal)
 Cidálio Caetano — did not finish
 Delfim Moreira — did not finish

20 km Walk:
 José Pinto — 1:30:57 (→ 25th)

50 km Walk:
 José Pinto — 4:04:42 (→ 8th)

Women's Events
800m:
 Maria Machado
 Round 1 (heat 4) — 2:05.74 (→ 5th, did not advance)

3000m:
 Aurora Cunha
 Round 1 (heat 1) — 8:46.38 (→ 4th, advanced as 2nd fastest loser)
 Final — 8:46.37 (→ 6th)

 Maria Machado
 Round 1 (heat 2) — 9:01.77 (→ 4th, did not advance)

 Rosa Mota
 Round 1 (heat 3) — did not finish

Marathon:
 Conceição Ferreira — 2:50:58 (→ 39th)
 Rita Borralho — 2:50:58 (→ 38th)
 Rosa Mota — 2:26:57 (→  Bronze Medal)

Diving

Women's 3m Springboard:
 Joana Figueiredo 
Preliminary — 374,07 pts (→ 22nd, did not advance)
{| class="wikitable" style="text-align:center;"
|-
!Dive!!1!!2!!3!!4!!5!!6!!7!!8!!9!!10!!rowspan=2|Total
|-
!Coef.
|1.5||1.9||2.0||1.7||2.4||2.4||2.8||2.8||2.1||2.5
|-
!Pts
|32,40||35,34||40,80||35,15||43,92||46,80||24,36||27,72||41,58||48,00||374,07
|}

Fencing

One fencer represented Portugal in 1984

Men's sabre
 João Marquilhas —  31st
 Round 1 (Pool C) — 5 matches, 0 victories (→ 6th, did not advance)
 Jorg Stratmann (FRG) (→ lost 5:4)
 John Zarno (GBR) (→ lost 5:3)
 Michael Lofton (USA) (→ lost 5:4)
 Ruiji Wang (CHN) (→ lost 5:2)
 Jean François Lamour (FRA) (→ lost 5:3)

Gymnastics

Individual All-Round Competition:
 Margarida Carmo — 54,575 pts (→ 18th)
{|class=wikitable style="text-align:center;"
!Hoop!!Ball!!Clubs!!Ribbon!!Results!!Prelim.
|-
|9,15||9,15||9,15||9,00||36,45||18,125
|-
!colspan=4|Total (results + prelim.)
|colspan=2|54,575
|}

 Maria João Falcão — 35,90 pts (→ 22nd)
{|class=wikitable style="text-align:center;"
!Hoop!!Ball!!Clubs!!Ribbon!!Results
|-
|9,05||9,00||9,20||8,65||35,90
|-
!colspan=4|Total
|35,90
|}

Judo

Men's Extra Lightweight (–60 kg):
 João Neves
Pool B
 Round 1 — Shinji Hosokawa (JPN) (→ lost by ippon)
 Repêchage — Luís Shinoara (BRA) (→ lost by default, did not advance)

Men's Half Lightweight (–65 kg):
 Rui Rosa
Pool A
 Round 1 — Bye
 Round 2 — Stephen Gawthorpe (GBR) (→ lost by ippon, did not advance)

Men's Lightweight (–71 kg):
 Hugo d'Assunção
Pool B
 Round 1 — Federico Vixcarra (MEX) (→ lost by waza-ari, did not advance)

Men's Half Middleweight (–76 kg):
 António Roquete Andrade
Pool A
 Round 1 — Javier Condor (CRC) (→ won by ippon)
 Round 2 — Abdoulaye Diallo (GUI) (→ won by ippon)
 Round 3 — Suheyl Yesilnur (TUR) (→ lost by koka, did not advance)

Modern pentathlon

Men's Individual Competition:
 Luís Monteiro — 4332 pts (→ 43rd)
{|class=wikitable style="text-align:center;"
!Event
!Riding
!Fencing
!Swimming
!Shooting
!Cross-country
!Total
|-
!Pts
|1070
|472
|1016
|868
|906
|4332
|}

 Manuel Barroso — 4085 pts (→ 49th)
{|class=wikitable style="text-align:center;"
!Event
!Riding
!Fencing
!Swimming
!Shooting
!Cross-country
!Total
|-
!Pts
|818
|670
|1200
|348
|1057
|4085
|}

 Roberto Durão — 4321 pts (→ 44th)
{|class=wikitable style="text-align:center;"
!Event
!Riding
!Fencing
!Swimming
!Shooting
!Cross-country
!Total
|-
!Pts
|918
|736
|904
|956
|807
|4321
|}

Men's Team Competition:
 Luís Monteiro, Manuel Barroso and Roberto Durão — 12738 pts (→ 16th)
{| class="wikitable" style="text-align:center;"
!Event
!Riding
!Fencing
!Swimming
!Shooting
!Cross-country
!Total
|-
!Pts
|2806
|1878
|3120
|2164
|2770
|12738
|}

Sailing

Star:
 António Correia and Henrique Anjos — 128 pts (→ 17th)
{|class=wikitable style="text-align:center;"
!Race!!1!!2!!3!!4!!5!!6!!7!!rowspan=2|Total!!rowspan=2|Net
|-
!Place
|13th||19th||15th||18th||14th||17th||16th
|-
!Pts
|19||25||21||24||20||23||22||153||128
|}

Windglider:
 José Monteiro — 152 pts (→ 22nd)
{|class=wikitable style="text-align:center;"
!Race!!1!!2!!3!!4!!5!!6!!7!!rowspan=2|Total!!rowspan=2|Net
|-
!Place
|18th||23rd||25th||26th||17th||23rd||13th
|-
!Pts
|24||29||31||32||23||29||19||184||152
|}

Shooting

Men's 25m Rapid Fire Pistol:
 Francisco Neto — 586 hits (→ 20th)
{|class="wikitable" style="text-align:center;"
!rowspan=2|Time(secs)
!colspan=4|Stage 1
!colspan=4|Stage 2
!rowspan=2|Total
|-
!1!!2!!1+2!!Sum (1+2)
!1!!2!!1+2!!Sum (1+2)
|-
!8
|49||49||98||rowspan=3|294
|49||49||98||rowspan=3|292
|rowspan=3|586
|-
!6
|50||50||100
|49||49||98
|-
!4
|47||49||96
|47||49||96
|}

 José Pena — 571 hits (→ 42nd)
{|class="wikitable" style="text-align:center;"
!rowspan=2|Time(secs)
!colspan=4|Stage 1
!colspan=4|Stage 2
!rowspan=2|Total
|-
!1!!2!!1+2!!Sum (1+2)
!1!!2!!1+2!!Sum (1+2)
|-
!8
|50||49||99||rowspan=3|287
|50||49||99||rowspan=3|284
|rowspan=3|571
|-
!6
|49||49||98
|47||48||95
|-
!4
|46||44||90
|46||44||90
|}

Men's 50m Pistol:
 José Pena — 533 hits (→ 39th)
{|class="wikitable" style="text-align:center;"
!Round!!1!!2!!3!!4!!5!!6!!Total
|-
!Hits
|90||87||87||87||95||87||533
|}

Men's Trap:
 José Faria — 179 hits (→ 28th)
{|class="wikitable" style="text-align:center;"
!Round!!1!!2!!3!!4!!5!!6!!7!!8!!Total
|-
!Hits
|24||21||24||22||24||20||23||21||179
|}

Women's 25m Pistol:
 Maria Chitas — 572 hits (→ 15th)
{|class="wikitable" style="text-align:center;"
!Round!!1!!2!!3!!4!!5!!6!!Total
|-
!Hits
|92||97||94||96||97||96||572
|}

Swimming

Men's 100m Breaststroke:
 Alexandre Yokochi
 Heats (heat 4) — 1:07.80 (→ 5th, did not advance)

Men's 200m Breaststroke:
 Alexandre Yokochi
 Heats (heat 2) — 2:19.76 (→ 2nd)
 Final A — 2:20.69 (→ 7th)

Men's 100m Butterfly:
 João Santos
 Heats (heat 4) — 58.17 (→ 6th, did not advance)

Men's 200m Butterfly:
 João Santos
 Heats (heat 5) — 2:04.72 (→ 5th, did not advance)

Weightlifting

Men's Flyweight (–52 kg):
 Raul Diniz 
Group B — 0,0 kg (→ no classification)
{|class=wikitable style="text-align:center;"
!rowspan=2|Event!!colspan=3|Attempt!!rowspan=2|Result
|-
!1!!2!!3
|-
!Snatch
|82,5||87,5||87,5||82,5
|-
!Clean& Jerk
|115,0||115,0||115,0||0,0
|-
!colspan=4|Total
|0,0
|}

Men's Middleweight (–75 kg):
 Jorge Soares
Group B — withdraw

Men's Middle Heavyweight (–90 kg):
 Francisco Coelho
Group B — 340,0 kg (→ 13th)
{|class=wikitable style="text-align:center;"
!rowspan=2|Event!!colspan=3|Attempt!!rowspan=2|Result
|-
!1!!2!!3
|-
!Snatch
|150,0||150,0||160,0||160,0
|-
!Clean& Jerk
|190,0||190,0||195,0||190,0
|-
!colspan=4|Total
|340,0
|}

Officials
 José Vicente de Moura (chief of mission)

References

Notes
Los Angeles Olympic Organizing Committee (1985). Official Report of the Games of the XXIII Olympiad Los Angeles, 1984 - Volume 1: Organization and planning (Retrieved on November 9, 2006)
Los Angeles Olympic Organizing Committee (1985). Official Report of the Games of the XXIII Olympiad Los Angeles, 1984 - Volume 2: Competition summary and results (Retrieved on November 9–10, 2006)
International Olympic Committee – Olympic medal winners database

Nations at the 1984 Summer Olympics
1984 Summer Olympics
1984 in Portuguese sport